Emil Blichfeldt (5 November 1849 – 20 October 1908) was a Danish architect who worked in the Historicist style.

Biography
Frederik Thorvald Emil Blichfeldt was born in Copenhagen. He studied at the Royal Danish Academy of Fine Arts from 1864 to 1871 while at the same time working as an assistant for Ferdinand Meldahl. He won the Academy's small gold medal in 1876 and the large gold medal in 1878 with a project for a national museum. Blichtfeldt won the academy's travel scholarships in 1878, 1879, 1880 and 1881 and was on a multi-year stay in Italy until spring 1882. His first assignment was under the supervision of Meldahl to plan and oversee the construction of a housing fringe surrounding the Marble Church in Copenhagen. He exhibited drawings at Charlottenborg Spring Exhibition 1874 and 1878, at Nordic Exhibition of 1888 in Copenhagen.

Blichfeldt was married in 1908 with Sidse Dorthea Sophie Caroline Saabye (1872-1935). He was the Knight of the Order of the Dannebrog. He died at 59 years of age in Copenhagen and was buried at Bispebjerg Cemetery.

Selected works
 Frederiksgade Housing fringe, Frederiksstaden, Copenhagen (1876–94)
 73-77 Bredgade/18 Esplanaden, Copenhagen (1884–86)
 Main entrance, Tivoli Gardens, Copenhagen (1889–90)
 Great Northern Telegraph Company, Kongens Nytorv, Copenhagen (1890–94)
 Messen Department Store, Købmagergade, Copenhagen (1895)
 12-16 Halmtorvet, Copenhagen (1897–98)

Image gallery

References

External links

Bispebjerg Kirkegård

Architects from Copenhagen
1849 births
1908 deaths
Royal Danish Academy of Fine Arts alumni
Knights of the Order of the Dannebrog